Michael G. Roskin (born 1939) is an American political scientist. He is a retired Professor Emeritus of Political Science at Lycoming College in Williamsport, Pennsylvania.

Background
Roskin received his A.B. at the University of California at Berkeley and M.A. at the University of California at Los Angeles. He served as a journalist and foreign service officer for the U.S. Information Agency before earning his Ph.D. in international relations at The American University.

Career
Roskin began teaching at Lycoming College in 1972. Roskin served as Visiting Professor of Foreign Policy at the U.S. Army War College from 1991 to 1994. He is the author of five political science textbooks.

In 2008, Roskin retired from teaching, after being named a Fulbright Scholar; he continues to lecture.

In 2020, Roskin wrote that "anti-Russian accusations have switched parties" from Republicans denouncing Democrats in the 1950s and 1960s to Democrats bashing Republicans in the 2010s and 2020s as traitors under the influence of Moscow (then USSR, now Russian Federation). He compared the McCarthyist attack in the 1950s on "China Hands" to Steve Bannon's "deconstruction of the administrative state."  He noted that Kennan declined to judge if Alger Hiss was a spy. (He probably was.)"  He compared the Hiss case to President Donald J. Trump's "operative" Paul Manafort's own "deep contacts" with Russian intelligence agents.  However, he contrasted with the past a current "willingness of many career officials to resign."

Works
According to the Library of Congress, Roskin has published:
 Other governments of Europe: Sweden, Spain, Italy, Yugoslavia, and East Germany (1977)
 Countries and concepts: an introduction to comparative politics (1982, 1986, 1989, 1992, 1995, 1998, 2001)
 Political science:  an introduction (1988, 1994, 1997, 2000)
 IR, an introduction to international relations with Nicholas O. Berry (1990, 1991, 1993, 1997, 2002)
 National interest: from abstraction to strategy (1994)
 Rebirth of East Europe (1994, 1997)
 Hard road to democracy: four developing nations (2001)

References

1939 births
Living people
American political scientists
University of California alumni
Lycoming College faculty
People from Williamsport, Pennsylvania
American University alumni